Hanuman Garhi, Nainital is a temple of Lord Hanuman in the hill station of Nainital often visited by local saint, Neem Karoli Baba. The presiding deity of the temple is Lord Hanuman, the vanara god of the Ramayana, and he is depicted tearing open his chest to reveal Rama and Sita in his heart. Hanuman Garhi also is known for its views of the setting sun.

References 

Hanuman temples
Hindu temples in Uttarakhand